Jeyson Alejandro Rojas Orellana (born 23 January 2002) is a Chilean footballer who plays as a defender for Colo-Colo.

Club career
He came to Colo-Colo in 2015 and made three appearances at the 2020 U-20 Copa Libertadores scoring a goal against Jorge Wilstermann U20. Later, he made his professional debut in a Primera División match against Huachipato on October 3, 2020.

International career
Rojas made his debut for the Chile national team on 9 December 2021 in a 2–2 draw against Mexico.

He represented Chile at under-23 level in a 1–0 win against Peru U23 on 31 August 2022, in the context of preparations for the 2023 Pan American Games.

References

External links
 

2002 births
Living people
Chilean footballers
Chilean Primera División players
Colo-Colo footballers
Association football defenders